The ”Fallotaspidoidea” are a superfamily of trilobites, a group of extinct marine arthropods. It lived during the Lower Cambrian (Atdabanian) and species occurred on all paleocontinents except for the Gondwana heartland (currently Latin America, most of Africa, Australia, Antarctica, India and China). A member of this group, Profallotaspis jakutensis, has long been the earliest known trilobite, but recently the redlichiid Lemdadella has been claimed as occurring even earlier.

Distribution 
”Fallotaspidoidea” occur in the Lower Cambrian of North America (Cordilleran region and northern Greenland), Europe (United Kingdom, Comley area; Ukraine), northwestern Africa and northern Asia (Siberia).

Dispersion of the “Fallotaspidoidea” 
Lieberman (2002) suggests that fallotaspidoids, the first hard-shelled trilobites (or Eutrilobites), originate in the paleocontinent Siberia. The group quickly spread to southern Europe and northwestern Africa, which were part of the margin of Gondwana (or Peri-Gondwana), and northwestern Laurentia. The sutured Redlichiina developed from the fallotaspidoids somewhere in Siberia and the Gondwana-margin, and from there spread to all of Gondwana, including current China and Australia, where fallotaspidoids and other Olenellina were absent. In Laurentia the Fallotaspidoids were succeeded by Nevadioids, Judomioids and Olenelloids, the latter remaining the dominant group of trilobites until the extinction of all Olenellina at the very end of the Lower Cambrian, after which Redlichiina, Ptychopariida and Corynexochida took over.

Taxonomy 
The views of scholars on the relationships of the taxa now assigned to the ”Fallotaspidoidea” have changed regularly over the past half century or so.  Initially, the Olenellidae, which also encompassed the subfamily Fallotaspidinae, was regarded the sistergroup of the Daguinaspididae, a view that made it into the Treatise of 1959. Later, the genera now in the ”Fallotaspidoidea” were considered part of the Holmiinae, the sistergroup of the Olenellinae and the Nevadiinae. Bergström recognized within the family Daguinaspididae five subfamilies: the Daguinaspidinae and the Fallotaspidinae (including Andalusiana, and Bradyfallotaspis), together comprising the current ”Fallotaspidoidea”, in addition to the Nevadiinae, the Neltneriinae and the Callaviniinae. This was followed by the view that the Archaeaspididae (including Bradyfallotaspis), the Fallotaspididae and the Daguinaspididae were all families of their own and sistergroups of the Olenellidae, Homiidae, and Nevadiidae. Ahlberg et al., moved the Archaeaspis-group as a subfamily to the Callaviidae, leaving the Fallotaspis-group and the Daguinaspis-group as subfamilies in the Daguinaspididae. Palmer and Repina erected two superfamilies, the Olenelloidea and the Fallotaspidoidea, the latter consisting of the Fallotaspididae (comprising the Fallotaspidinae and the Daguinaspidinae), and the Archaeaspididae, next to the Nevadiidae, the Neltneriidae and the Judomiidae. This opinion was reflected in the Revised Treatise of 1997.

More recent cladistic analysis suggests that the ”Fallotaspidoidea” are the sister group of all other Olenellina (Judomiidoidea, Nevadiidoidea and Olenelloidea). The ”Fallotaspidoidea” remain paraphyletic (hence the quotation marks), even after reorganizing it, because it gave rise to the trilobites with dorsal sutures. Applying a strictly cladistic approach would call for including the ”Fallotaspidoidea” in the Redlichiina, and possibly raising the status of the remaining Olenellina to become an order (and be renamed to Olenellida).

Relations within the ”Fallotaspidoidea” 
Repinaella is closest to the common ancestor with the other Olenellina. Second to split away is the Daguinaspididae-family, which comprises the closely knit group of Choubertella, Daguinaspis and Wolynaspis, with Eofallotaspis slightly further removed, and near the basis a subgroup consisting of Profallotaspis and Pelmanaspis. The monotypical family Fallotaspididae is next to branch-off.  This is followed by the branch of  Parafallotaspis all on its own, followed by the monotypical family Archaeaspididae. Finally Fallotaspidella is closest to the trilobites with dorsal cephalic sutures, such as Bigotina and Lemdadella.

Genera previously assigned to the ”Fallotaspidoidea” 
Bradyfallotaspis fusa, Geraldinella corneiliana and Selindella gigantea, all have a long frontal glabellar lobe (L4), and eye ridges that contact only the posterior part of L4, and so these genera belong to the “Nevadioidea“.

Description 
As with most early trilobites, the Fallotaspidoidea have an almost flat exoskeleton, that is only thinly calcified, and has crescent-shaped eye ridges. As part of the Olenellina suborder, the Fallotaspidoidea lack dorsal sutures. The superfamily can be distinguished from all other Olenellina by features of the cephalon and in particular the glabella. The glabella tapers forward. The frontal lobe of the glabella (because it is counted from the back, it is numbered L4) is as long as the most backward lobe (L0), less than in the other Olenellina. The eye ridges (or ocular lobes) contact, but do not merge with, the entire frontal margin of the glabella.

Key to the genera 
This key complements the key in the Olenellina article.

References 

 
Olenellina
Cambrian trilobites
Cambrian first appearances
Terreneuvian extinctions